The prolate spheroidal wave functions are eigenfunctions of the Laplacian in prolate spheroidal coordinates, adapted to boundary conditions on certain ellipsoids of revolution (an ellipse rotated around its long axis, “cigar shape“). Related are the oblate spheroidal wave functions (“pancake shaped” ellipsoid).

Solutions to the wave equation 
Solve the Helmholtz equation,
, by the method of separation of variables in prolate spheroidal coordinates, with:

Here,  is the interfocal distance of the elliptical cross section of the prolate spheroid. 
Setting , the solution  can be written

The radial wave function   satisfies the linear ordinary differential equation:

The angular wave function satisfies the differential equation:

It is the same differential equation as in the case of the radial wave function. However, the range of the variable is different: in the radial wave function, while in the angular wave function, .

For  both differential equations reduce to the equations satisfied by the associated Legendre polynomials. For , the angular spheroidal wave functions can be expanded as a series of Legendre functions.

If one writes , the function  satisfies

 

which is known as the spheroidal wave equation. This auxiliary equation has been used by Stratton.

Band-limited signals 
In signal processing, the prolate spheroidal wave functions (PSWF) are useful as eigenfunctions of a time-limiting operation followed by a low-pass filter. The operator  turns out to be linear, bounded and self-adjoint. For  we denote with  the -th eigenfunction, defined as

 

The band-limited functions  are the prolate spheroidal wave functions, proportional to the  introduced above. (See also Spectral concentration problem.) 

Pioneering work in this area was performed by Slepian and Pollak, Landau and Pollak, and Slepian.

Prolate spheroidal wave functions whose domain is a (portion of) the surface of the unit sphere are more generally called "Slepian functions". These are of great utility in disciplines such as geodesy or cosmology.

Technical information and history 
There are different normalization schemes for spheroidal functions. A table of the different schemes can be found in Abramowitz and Stegun who follow the notation of Flammer.
The Digital Library of Mathematical Functions provided by NIST is an excellent resource for spheroidal wave functions.

Tables of numerical values of spheroidal wave functions are given in Flammer, Hunter, Hanish et al., and Van Buren et al.

Originally, the spheroidal wave functions were introduced by C. Niven, which lead to a Helmholtz equation in spheroidal coordinates. Monographs tying together many aspects of the theory of spheroidal wave functions were written by Strutt, Stratton et al., Meixner and Schafke, and Flammer.

Flammer provided a thorough discussion of the calculation of the eigenvalues, angular wavefunctions, and radial wavefunctions for both the prolate and the oblate case. Computer programs for this purpose have been developed by many, including King et al., Patz and Van Buren, Baier et al., Zhang and Jin, Thompson and Falloon. Van Buren and Boisvert have recently developed new methods for calculating prolate spheroidal wave functions that extend the ability to obtain numerical values to extremely wide parameter ranges. Fortran source code that combines the new results with traditional methods is available at http://www.mathieuandspheroidalwavefunctions.com.
 
Asymptotic expansions of angular prolate spheroidal wave functions for large values of  have been derived by Müller. He also investigated the relation between asymptotic expansions of spheroidal wave functions.

References

External links 
 MathWorld Spheroidal Wave functions
 MathWorld Prolate Spheroidal Wave Function
 MathWorld Oblate Spheroidal Wave function

Special functions
Wavelets